The following is a list of Kansas Wildcats men's basketball head coaches. The Wildcats have had 24 head coaches. A number of notable and successful coaches have led the Wildcats through the years.  Following are all the coaches that have been at Kansas State.

|-
|Charles W. Melick || 1905–1906 || align=center |7|| 9 || .438 || N/A || N/A || N/A ||
|-
|Mike Ahearn || 1906–1911 || align=center |26|| 24 || .520 || N/A || N/A || N/A ||
|-
|Guy Lowman || 1911–1914 || align=center |30|| 16 || .652 || 0 || 10 || .000 ||
|-
|Carl J. Merner || 1914–1916 || align=center |19|| 15 || .559 || 13 || 13 || .500 ||
|-
|Zora G. Clevenger || 1916–1920 || align=center |54|| 17 || .761 || 38 || 16 || .704 || <small>• 2 Conference Regular Season Championships (1917, 1919)
|-
|E.A. Knoth || 1920–1921 || align=center|14|| 6 || .700 || 11 || 4 || .733 || 
|-
|E.C. Curtiss || 1921–1923 || align=center |5|| 28 || .152 || 5 || 27 || .156 ||
|-
|Charles Corsaut || 1923–1933 || align=center |89|| 81 || .524 || 61 || 63 || .492 ||
|-
|Frank Root || 1933–1939 || align=center |38|| 72 || .345 || 19 || 47 || .287 ||
|-
|Jack Gardner†^ || 1939–1942; 1946–1953 || align=center |147|| 81 || .645 || 66 || 46 || .589 || <small>• 1 NCAA Championship Game (1951) • 2 Final Fours (1948, 1951) • 1 Sweet Sixteen (1951) • 2 Tournament Appearances (1948, 1951) • 3 Conference Regular Season Championships (1948, 1950, 1951) • 3 Conference Holiday Tournament Championships (1947, 1950, 1952) • 2 times ranked in top 6 of final AP and UPI polls (1951, 1952)
|-
|Chili Cochrane|| 1942–1943 || align=center |6|| 14 || .300 || 1 || 9 || .100 ||
|-
|Cliff Rock || 1943–1944 || align=center |7||15 || .318 || 1 || 9 || .100 ||
|-
|Fritz Knorr || 1944–1946 || align=center |14||33 || .298 || 6 || 14 || .300 ||
|-
|Tex Winter†^ || 1953–1968 || align=center |261||118 || .689 || 154 || 57 || .730 || <small>• 2 Final Fours (1958, 1964) • 4 Elite Eights (1958, 1959, 1961,1964) • 6 Sweet Sixteens (1956, 1958, 1959, 1961, 1964, 1968) • 6 Tournament Appearances (1956, 1958, 1959, 1961, 1964, 1968) • 8 Conference Regular Season Championships (1956, 1958–1961, 1963, 1964, 1968) • 4 Conference Holiday Tournament Championships (1958, 1960, 1961, 1963) • Ranked No. 1 in final AP and UPI polls (1959) • 4 times ranked in top 6 of final AP and UPI polls (1958, 1959, 1961, 1962)  • UPI National Coach of the Year (1958) • Big 7 Coach of the Year (1958) • 2-time Big 8 Coach of the Year (1959, 1960) • Undefeated conference season (14–0) (1959) • Developed the Triangle offense
|-
|Cotton Fitzsimmons || 1968–1970 || align=center |34||20 || .630 || 19 || 9 || .679 || <small>• 1 Sweet Sixteen (1970) • 1 Tournament Appearances (1970)• 1 Conference Regular Season Championship (1970) • Big 8 Coach of the Year (1970) • NABC District Coach of the Year (1970)
|-
|Jack Hartman || 1970–1986 || align=center |295||169 || .636 || 133 || 91 || .594 || <small>• 4 Elite Eights (1972, 1973, 1975, 1981) • 6 Sweet Sixteens (1972, 1973, 1975, 1977, 1981, 1982) • 7 Tournament Appearances (1972, 1973, 1975, 1977, 1980–1982)• 3 Conference Regular Season Championships (1972, 1973, 1977) • 2 Conference Tournament Championships (1977, 1980) • NABC Coach of the Year (1980) • 2-time Big 8 Coach of the Year (1975, 1977) • NABC District Coach of the Year (1977) • Most wins in program history
|-
|Lon Kruger || 1986–1990 || align=center |81||46 || .638 || 34 || 22 || .607 || <small>• 1 Elite Eight (1988) • 1 Sweet Sixteen (1988) • 4 Tournament Appearances (1987–1990)• NABC District Coach of the Year (1988) • Only KSU coach to take squads to NCAA Tournament in four consecutive seasons
|-
|Dana Altman || 1990–1994 || align=center |68||54 || .557 || 19 || 37 || .339 || <small> • 1 Tournament Appearance (1993)• Big 8 Coach of the Year (1993)
|-
|Tom Asbury || 1994–2000 || align=center |85||88 || .491 || 29 || 63 || .315 || <small> • 1 Tournament Appearance (1996)
|-
|Jim Wooldridge || 2000–2006 || align=center |83||90 || .480 ||32 ||64 ||.333 ||
|-
|Bob Huggins || 2006–2007 || align=center |23||12 || .657 ||10 ||6 ||.625 ||
|-
|Frank Martin || 2007–2012 || align=center |117||54 ||  || 50 || 32 ||.610 || <small>• 1 Elite Eight (2010) • 1 Sweet Sixteen (2010) • 4 Tournament Appearances (2008, 2010–2012) • Big 12 Coach of the Year (AP and coaches) (2010) • Highest NCAA seed (2) in program history (2010) • Most wins (29) in one season in program history (2010) • CollegeInsider.com Big 12 Coach of the Year (2008) • Jim Phelan Award as mid-season National Coach of the Year (2009–10) • USBWA District VI Coach of the Year (2010) • NABC District 8 Coach of the Year (2010) • Only KSU coach to win 20 or more games in first 5 seasons
|-
|Bruce Weber || 2012–2022 || align=center | 143|| 85||  ||63 ||55  || || • 1 Elite Eight (2018) • 1 Sweet Sixteen (2018) • 5 NCAA Tournament Appearances (2013, 2014, 2017-2019) • 2 Conference regular season Championships (2013, 2019) • Big 12 Coach of the Year (AP and coaches) (2013) • USBWA District VI Coach of the Year (2013)• Most wins (27) by a first-year coach in program history (2013)• Most wins (47) in the first 2 years.• Most conference wins (14) by a first-year coach in program history (2013)• Most conference wins (24) in the first 2 years.• Most conference wins (32) in the first 3 years.• Most all-time Top 25 victories (27)• Only KSU coach to win 25 or more games in back to back seasons
|-
| Jerome Tang
| 2022–Present
| 18
| 4
| 
| 6
| 3
| 
| <small>• Highest winning percentage in program history • Highest conference winning percentage in program history • Best start in program history by a first year coach

References

Kansas State

Kansas State Wildcats basketball, men's, coaches